"Flow Joe" is the debut single by American rapper Fat Joe, from his 1993 album Represent. It contains samples of "Get Out of My Life, Woman" by Lee Dorsey and "The Long Wait" by Morton Stevens.

Music video 
The music video for the single depicts Fat Joe and his posse in an alley, also standing on a fire escape at the side of a building. The video flashes from black and white, to color.

Charts

References 

1993 debut singles
Fat Joe songs
1993 songs
Relativity Records singles
Songs written by Fat Joe
Songs written by Diamond D